This article details the Bradford Bulls rugby league football club's 2007 season. This is the 12th season of the Super League era.

Season Review

February 2007

March 2007

April 2007

May 2007

2007 Milestones

Round 1: Shontayne Hape scored his 75th try and reached 300 points for the Bulls.
Round 1: Glenn Morrison and David Solomona scored their 1st tries for the Bulls.
Round 2: Michael Platt and James Evans scored their 1st tries for the Bulls.
Round 2: Michael Platt scored his 1st hat-trick for the Bulls.
Round 3: Lesley Vainikolo scored his 11th hat-trick for the Bulls.
Round 3: Paul Deacon reached 2,000 points for the Bulls.
Round 5: Michael Platt scored his 2nd hat-trick for the Bulls.
Round 10: Iestyn Harris reached 200 points for the Bulls.
Round 10: Dave Halley scored his 1st try for the Bulls.
Round 11: Paul Deacon kicked his 900th goal for the Bulls.
Round 12: Paul Deacon reached 2,100 points for the Bulls.
CCR5: Matt Cook scored his 1st try for the Bulls.
Round 15: Lesley Vainikolo scored his 12th hat-trick for the Bulls.
Round 15: Richard Hawkyard scored his 1st try for the Bulls.
CCQF: Tame Tupou scored his 1st try for the Bulls.
Round 17: Terry Newton scored his 1st four-try haul and 1st hat-trick for the Bulls.
Round 17: Lesley Vainikolo kicked his 1st goal for the Bulls.
Round 19: Paul Deacon reached 2,200 points for the Bulls.
Round 22: Sam Burgess kicked his 1st goal for the Bulls.
Round 25: Ben Harris scored his 25th try and reached 100 points for the Bulls.
EPO: David Solomona scored his 1st hat-trick for the Bulls.

Table

2007 Fixtures and results

2007 Engage Super League

Challenge Cup

Playoffs

2007 squad statistics

 Appearances and Points include (Super League, Challenge Cup and Play-offs) as of 2012.

References

External links
Bradford Bulls Website
Bradford Bulls in T&A
Bradford Bulls on Sky Sports
Bradford on Super League Site
Red,Black And Amber
BBC Sport-Rugby League 

Bradford Bulls seasons
Bradford Bulls